Selat Lumut-SKVE Bridge is an expressway bridge across Lumut Straits in Klang Valley, Selangor, Malaysia. It is a second longest straits bridge in the Klang Valley after Selat Lumut Bridge. It connects Pulau Carey to Pulau Indah on the South Klang Valley Expressway. A runaway truck ramp is provided on both ends of the bridge because of a 4% steep grade on the bridge.

History 
Construction officially began in 2010 and was completed on 1 October 2013. Construction was led by SKVE Holdings Sdn Bhd.

See also
 South Klang Valley Expressway

Bridges in Selangor